This is a list of museums in the Democratic Republic of the Congo.

Museums in the Democratic Republic of the Congo 
 National Museum of the Democratic Republic of Congo
 National Museum of Lubumbashi
 Butembo Museum
 Kananga Museum
 Kisangani Museum
 Kivu Museum in Catholic Mission of Xaverian Fathers, Bukavu
 Lubumbashi Museum
 Mbandaka Museum
 Mushenge Museum

See also 
 List of museums

External links 
 Congo, Democratic Republic of the (DROC) - Libraries and museums

 
Congo, Democratic Republic of the 
Museums
Museums
Museums
Congo, Democratic Republic of the